Urban terrain is a military term for the representation of the urban environment within the context of urban warfare. Urban terrain includes buildings, roads, highways, ports, rails, airports, subways, and sewage lines.

Mouse-holing is one military technique used to overcome some of the physical barriers within the urban environment.

See also
Urban warfare
Urban area
Manhole cover
Subterranean warfare

References

Military terminology
Synthetic human-made environment
Urban warfare